This article presents a list of the historical events and publications of Australian literature during 1941.

Books 

 Eleanor Dark – The Timeless Land
 Arthur Gask – The Beachy Head Murder
 Ernestine Hill – My Love Must Wait : The Story of Matthew Flinders
 Michael Innes – Appleby on Ararat
 Jack Lindsay
 Hannibal Takes a Hand
 The Stormy Violence
 Jack McLaren – Their Isle of Desire
 Katharine Susannah Prichard – Moon of Desire
 Kylie Tennant – The Battlers
 Patrick White – The Living and the Dead

Children's 

 Mary Durack – The Way of the Whirlwind
 May Gibbs – Scotty in Gumnut Land
 P. L. Travers – I Go By Sea, I Go By Land

Short stories 

 Marjorie Barnard – "Dry Spell"
 Xavier Herbert – "Josie"
 Lennie Lower – The Bachelors' Guide to the Care of the Young and Other Stories
 Vance Palmer – "Kaijek the Songman"

Poetry 

 Kathleen Dalziel – Known and Not Held : Verses
 James Devaney – "Bamba"
 Mary Gilmore – The Disinherited
 Lesbia Harford – The Poems of Lesbia Harford
 Furnley Maurice – "Apples in the Moon"
 Ian Mudie – This is Australia
 John Shaw Neilson – "Say This For Love"
 Bernard O'Dowd – The Poems of Bernard O'Dowd
 Douglas Stewart – Sonnets to the Unknown Soldier

Drama 

 Douglas Stewart – The Fire on the Snow

Awards and honours

Literary

Births 

A list, ordered by date of birth (and, if the date is either unspecified or repeated, ordered alphabetically by surname) of births in 1941 of Australian literary figures, authors of written works or literature-related individuals follows, including year of death.

 7 February – Beverley Farmer, novelist and short story writer (died 2018)
 23 March – Bruce Bennett, literary academic (died 2012)
31 May – Julian Croft, poet
 23 June 
 Margaret Hamilton, children's literature publisher and author (died 2022)
 Roger McDonald, novelist
 22 September – Murray Bail, novelist
 18 November – Jennifer Rankin, poet and playwright (died 1979)
 15 December – Richard Neville, author and editor (died 2016)
 21 December – Mungo MacCallum,  political journalist and commentator (died 2020)

Unknown date
 Elaine Forrestal, novelist
Hilary McPhee, publisher and editor
 Barry Maitland, novelist

Deaths 

A list, ordered by date of death (and, if the date is either unspecified or repeated, ordered alphabetically by surname) of deaths in 1941 of Australian literary figures, authors of written works or literature-related individuals follows, including year of birth.

 5 February – A. B. Paterson, author and poet (born 1864)
 27 April – Winifred Lewellin James, author (born 1876)
 13 June — Alice Guerin Crist, poet, author and journalist (born 1876)
 7 July – Randolph Bedford, poet and novelist (born 1868)
 13 November — Enid Derham, poet and academic (born 1882)

See also 
 1941 in poetry
 List of years in literature
 List of years in Australian literature
1941 in literature
1940 in Australian literature
1941 in Australia
1942 in Australian literature

References

Literature
Australian literature by year
20th-century Australian literature
1941 in literature